The River is a 2012 American found-footage supernatural adventure horror television series that debuted during the 2011–12 television winter season on ABC as a mid-season replacement. Eight episodes were produced for the first season. The series ran from February 7, 2012 to March 20, 2012. On May 11, 2012, ABC officially canceled the series.

The show has been met with generally favorable reviews. After The River was officially canceled by ABC due to its sub-par ratings, Netflix was in talks with ABC Studios about possibly continuing the series on its video-on-demand digital distribution service, though they ultimately passed.

Synopsis
Famed explorer Dr. Emmet Cole (Bruce Greenwood) went looking for "magic" deep in the uncharted Amazon basin and never returned. The shocking truth about his disappearance is out there, somewhere, just waiting to be discovered. To the millions of children who grew up watching his nature show, Dr. Cole was a hero. To his own son, Lincoln (Joe Anderson), he was more of an enigma. Now, six months after he vanished, Lincoln is finally ready to bury the past when Dr. Cole's emergency beacon suddenly goes off. At the urging of his mother, Tess (Leslie Hope), Lincoln reluctantly joins her on a search for his father. To fund the rescue, they agree to let Dr. Cole's cagey ex-producer, Clark (Paul Blackthorne), film the mission documentary-style. The mixed crew of old friends and new acquaintances includes the missing cameraman's daughter, Lena Landry (Eloise Mumford), ship's mechanic Emilio Valenzuela (Daniel Zacapa), and private security bodyguard Captain Kurt Brynildson (Thomas Kretschmann).

Cast and characters

Main
 Bruce Greenwood as Dr. Emmet Cole, a famed explorer and TV personality
 Joe Anderson as Lincoln Cole, a medical student and Emmet's son
 Leslie Hope as Tess Cole, Emmet's wife and Lincoln's mother
 Eloise Mumford as Lena Landry, Lincoln's childhood friend and Russ' daughter
 Paul Blackthorne as Clark Quietly, Emmet's producer
 Thomas Kretschmann as Capt. Kurt Brynildson, a private security bodyguard hired to protect Clark's group
 Daniel Zacapa as Emilio Valenzuela, the ship's mechanic and Jahel's father
 Shaun Parkes as A.J. Poulain, Clark's lead cameraman
 Paulina Gaitán as Jahel Valenzuela, Emilio's daughter

Guest
 Scott Michael Foster as Jonas Beckett, the second cameraman of Emmet's expedition
 Katie Featherston as Rosetta "Rabbit" Fischer, a camera operator in Emmet's expedition
 Lee Tergesen as Russ Landry, Emmet's longtime lead cameraman and Lena's father
 Jeff Galfer as Sammy Kirsch, Clark's second cameraman
 Jose Pablo Cantillo as Manny Centeno, a camera operator in Emmet's expedition
 Don McManus as Patrick, the leader of crew trapped on a ghost ship
 Karen LeBlanc as Annabele, a crew member trapped on the ghost ship
 Walter Perez as Soup, a crew member trapped on the ghost ship
 Kelemete Misipeka as Malosi, a crew member trapped on the ghost ship
 Lili Bordán as Hanna, Kurt's fiancée

Production

Oren Peli and Michael R. Perry created the series about a documentary crew searching the Amazon for a beloved scientist-explorer-television host. Peli told The Hollywood Reporter that producer Steven Schneider "became obsessed with this idea of nature run [amok] and animals taking over humans." Peli stated, "I started developing the idea of a missing documentary reporter who went to this weird place in the rainforest where strange things would happen". He added, "We were developing it as a low budget movie, but ... I had a meeting with Steven Spielberg". Spielberg suggested doing a television show with Peli. Perry added his thoughts, saying, "Why waste [the idea for The River] on a movie, when you can do a TV show where every season they go to a different place". Then, they pitched the whole pilot to Spielberg.
In September 2010, ABC won a bidding war against NBC for the rights to the project. In February 2011,  after a re-write by Michael Green, ABC green-lit the production of the pilot. In May 2011, ABC committed to produce eight episodes, announcing that the show would premiere in the 2011–12 mid-season.

The pilot episode was filmed in Puerto Rico and the next seven episodes were produced in Hawaii.

Release
The River premiered in the U.S. and Canada (on CTV) on February 7, 2012. The series aired in South Africa on DStv on February 21, 2012. In India the series started airing on STAR World on March 3, 2012.

In the United Kingdom the series has been picked up by Syfy on October 9, 2012 after being premiered on iTunes on February 8, 2012.

On May 22, 2012, ABC and DreamWorks/Amblin released the first season of The River in DVD format on to the United States and its territories, Canada, and Bermuda. Entitled "The River – The Complete First Season", the package includes all eight episodes in their entirety and features deleted scenes and episode audio commentaries.

Episodes
{{Episode table |background=#0C4722 |overall= |title= |director= |writer= |airdate= |viewers= |country=U.S. |episodes=

{{Episode list
 |EpisodeNumber = 5
 |Title = Peaches
 |DirectedBy = Rob Bailey
 |WrittenBy = Wendy Battles
 |OriginalAirDate = 
 |Aux4 = 4.04
 |ShortSummary = The Magus finds itself stranded and in need of some parts, when another ship comes to their rescue. However, the new ship's crew of environmentalists are far more dangerous than they appear, despite seeming friendly. Lena and Jonas discover the other ship has Lena's father, missing cameraman Russ, chained in the hull of their ship. Once more, the Magus'''s crew is in danger.   |LineColor = 0c4722
}}

}}

BroadcastThe River premiered in the U.S. and Canada (on CTV) on February 7, 2012. The series aired in South Africa on DStv on February 21, 2012.  In the United Kingdom the series was not initially picked up by a traditional broadcaster and instead premiered on iTunes on February 8, 2012. However, Syfy announced that it would air The River starting October 9, 2012 at 10pm.

Critical reception

On review aggregator Rotten Tomatoes, the series has an overall approval rating of 63% based on 27 reviews, with an average rating of 6.4/10. The website's critical consensus reads, "Despite its gimmicky premise and occasionally silly storylines, The River is a moderately scary and clever supernatural thriller." The show holds a 65/100 on Metacritic, based on reviews from 29 critics, indicating "generally favorable reviews." Matt Roush of TV Guide called the show "a terrifying heart-stopper, a cleverly cinematic supernatural adventure that takes us on a wild ride into an exotic heart of darkness." USA Today's Robert Bianco stated, "There are moments when The River, with its curse-around-every-corner setup, threatens to topple over into farce. But a strong cast and that things-that-go-bump-in-the-night shooting style so far keep the show on course". However, Mike Hale of The New York Times rated the show poorly, saying "The mixture of Lost storytelling and Paranormal Activity'' style is neither intriguing nor particularly scary, and it doesn't help that there's hardly a glimmer of humor".

References

External links
 
 

2010s American drama television series
2010s American horror television series
2012 American television series debuts
2012 American television series endings
American Broadcasting Company original programming
American action television series
English-language television shows
Found footage fiction
2010s American mockumentary television series
Television series about television
Television series by Amblin Entertainment
Television series by ABC Studios
Television shows filmed in Hawaii